Lawless Valley is a 1938 American Western film directed by David Howard from a screenplay by Oliver Drake, based on the short story "No Law in Shadow Valley" by W. C. Tuttle. Produced and distributed by RKO Radio Pictures, it opened on November 4, 1937. The film stars George O'Brien and Kay Sutton.

Plot
Framed for a robbery, Larry Rhodes gets out of prison and returns to Lawless Valley to seek the killer of his father.

Cast
 George O'Brien as Larry Rhodes
 Kay Sutton as Norma Rogers
 Walter Miller as Bob North
 Fred Kohler as Tom Marsh (credited as Fred Kohler Sr.)
 Fred Kohler Jr. as Jeff Marsh
 Lew Kelly as Fresno
 George MacQuarrie as Tim Wade
 Earle Hodgins as Sheriff Heck Hampton
 Chill Wills as Deputy Speedy McGow
 Dot Farley as Anna
 Victor Adamson as Townsman (uncredited)
 George Chesebro as Ranch Hand (uncredited)
 Ben Corbett as Short Ranch Hand (uncredited)
 The Four Tunes as Boxcar Singers (uncredited)
 Kirby Grant as Ranch Hand (uncredited)
 James Mason as Ranch Hand (uncredited)
 Bob McKenzie as Justice James McClung (uncredited)
 Carl Miller as Ranch Hand (uncredited)
 Frank O'Connor as Prison Guard (uncredited)
 Carl Stockdale as Seth, a Storekeeper (uncredited)

References

External links

1938 Western (genre) films
1938 films
American Western (genre) films
Films directed by David Howard
Films based on short fiction
American black-and-white films
RKO Pictures films
Films shot in California
Films produced by Bert Gilroy
1930s American films
1930s English-language films